Cédric Bardon (born 15 October 1976) is a former French footballer who last played for Étoile Fréjus Saint-Raphaël. He was one of the best players for the Bulgarian Levski Sofia at the time when he played for them.

Career

In France
He began his career at the local Olympique Lyonnais in 1992–93. He stayed in the team after 1997–98, having proven himself as an established player. Bardon played for Stade Rennais FC between 1998–99 and 2000–01. He also had a trial with English Premier League side Sunderland A.F.C. in August 2000 and played 3 pre-season matches for Sunderland against Fortuna Sittard, ASV Apeldoornse Boys and SC Heerenveen respectively. Bardon then moved to En Avant Guingamp to remain there until January 2004, when he was transferred to Le Havre AC.

PFC Levski Sofia – 1st spell
Bardon was then signed by Bulgarian team PFC Levski Sofia, after a scramble of interesting events. First, he arrived late in the transfer period and having not played for his former club in the previous months, being out of shape. Levski set up a friendly match against the team of Sliven only to have Bardon tried out. Many powerful figures for Levski came to the friendly, most notably Nasko Sirakov and then-owner Todor Batkov. Later it would become clear that they came to watch for Bardon's performance and decide whether to sign him on the spot. Bardon was decided upon after the first half of the match and was offered a contract with Levski. With the team, he played in the UEFA Cup 2005-06, notably scoring a goal against AJ Auxerre in Levski's 2–1 loss and being controversially sent off by referee Mike Riley in the first leg against FC Schalke 04 in the quarter finals. With Levski Sofia he reached 1/4 finals of UEFA Cup in 2005–06. Next season, Levski Sofia with Bardon, reached the group-stage of UEFA Champions League, becoming the first Bulgarian team that reached the groups.

Bnei Yehuda Tel Aviv F.C.
On 14 January 2008 he signed for the Israeli team, Bnei Yehuda Tel Aviv F.C. He scored two goals for his debut on 26 January 2008 against F.C. Ashdod and Bnei Yehuda Tel Aviv F.C. went on to win the match 3–2.

Anorthosis Famagusta
After the season 2007/2008 he was transferred to Cypriot champion Anorthosis Famagusta, which paid US$200,000 for him. With Anorthosis, Bardon played in the Champions League, the first time for a Cypriot team.
In the group stage, they earned their first point following a 0–0 away draw with Werder Bremen, then got their first win beating Panathinaikos FC 3–1 while Hawar Mulla Mohammed became the first Iraqi player to score in the UEFA Champions League, although they lost to Inter Milan 1–0 at San Siro, they drew 3–3 in GSP Stadium.
In their 5th Champions League game, Anorthosis had a chance to make it to the knock-out stage if they would have won against Werder Bremen.
Anorthosis went up 2–0, but in the second half Diego made the score 2–1, and minutes before the match ended, Hugo Almeida managed to equalise for Bremen, and the match finished 2–2. Anorthosis still had a chance to get into the knock-out stage in the final match against Panathinaikos if they won. However, in the last game they lost 1–0 away to Panathinaikos. Inter (who had already qualified for the next stage) lost 1–0 to Bremen, meaning that Anorthosis finished fourth – missing out on a consolation UEFA Cup place.

PFC Levski Sofia – 2nd spell
On 2 July 2009, it was announced that Cédric would return to Levski Sofia in a week. He arrived in Bulgaria the next day, to join PFC Levski Sofia for a second time. In the airport, Bardon was wearing Levski Sofia's kit. A few hours later, Bardon signed a 2-year contract with the Blues.

Bardon started his second spell at Levski on 15 July 2009 in the 2nd Qualifying round of the UEFA Champions League, where Levski beat UE Sant Julià of Andorra. The result of the match was a 4–0 home win for Levski.

In the next round, Levski Sofia faced FK Baku. The blues eliminated the team from Azerbaijan 2:0 (on aggregate). In the play-off round Levski was eliminated by Debreceni VSC with 4:1 (on aggregate). However, Levski qualified for the UEFA Europa League.

In the 2009/2010 season, despite a couple of bad games and results, Levski qualified for the UEFA Europa League after finishing 3rd in the final ranking.

On 4 June 2010, it was decided that Bardon was to be released from PFC Levski Sofia.

Étoile Fréjus Saint-Raphaël
After Bardon was officially released from Levski, on 10 June 2010 he signed a one-year contract with French 3rd division club Étoile Fréjus Saint-Raphaël.

Club career statistics
This statistic includes domestic league, domestic cup and European tournaments.

Last update: 16 May 2010 (Mistakes are possible)

Honours
 Olympique Lyonnais:
 UEFA Intertoto Cup Winner: 1997
 Levski Sofia:
 Champion of Bulgaria: 2005–06, 2006–07
 Bulgarian Cup Winner: 2006–07
 Bulgarian Super Cup Winner: 2005, 2007, 2009

References

External links
 Bardon at Levski's official website 
  Official player website from LEVSKI2000
 
 Yahoo! Sport UK profile for Cédric Bardon
 

1976 births
Living people
Footballers from Lyon
French footballers
Association football midfielders
Olympique Lyonnais players
Stade Rennais F.C. players
En Avant Guingamp players
Le Havre AC players
PFC Levski Sofia players
First Professional Football League (Bulgaria) players
Bnei Yehuda Tel Aviv F.C. players
French expatriate sportspeople in Israel
Expatriate footballers in Israel
Anorthosis Famagusta F.C. players
Expatriate footballers in Cyprus
French expatriate footballers
Ligue 1 players
Ligue 2 players
Cypriot First Division players
French expatriate sportspeople in Bulgaria